Glenham is a hamlet in Dutchess County, New York, United States. Glenham has a post office with ZIP code 12527, which opened on March 6, 1839. The hamlet is served by the Glenham Fire Department, which was formed in 1921.

References

Hamlets in Dutchess County, New York
Hamlets in New York (state)